Anchor Me may refer to:
 "Anchor Me" (The Blackeyed Susans song)
 "Anchor Me" (The Mutton Birds song)
 Anchor Me (film), a 2000 television film starring Annette Crosbie